The Women's Golf Charities Open was a golf tournament on the LPGA Tour, played only in 1970. It was played at the Inwood Forest Country Club in Houston, Texas. Marilynn Smith won the event in a sudden-death playoff with Sandra Haynie and Judy Rankin.

References

Former LPGA Tour events
Golf in Houston
Sports competitions in Houston
1970 establishments in Texas
1970 disestablishments in Texas
Women's sports in Texas